Articles related to Nova Scotia include:

A

B 
Beaver Bank, Nova Scotia
William Bennett (clergyman)
Minnie Blanche Bishop

C 
Coat of arms of Nova Scotia

D

E 
Executive Council of Nova Scotia

F 
Flag of Nova Scotia

G

H 
Halifax, Nova Scotia
History of Nova Scotia

I

J 
Joudrie

K

L 
Legislative Assembly of Nova Scotia
Lieutenant-Governor of Nova Scotia
List of colleges and universities in Nova Scotia
List of communities in Nova Scotia
List of symbols of Nova Scotia
List of Nova Scotia counties
List of Nova Scotia general elections (post-Confederation)
List of Nova Scotia provincial highways
List of Nova Scotia schools
List of Nova Scotians

M

N 
Nova Scotia Court of Appeal
Nova Scotia House of Assembly
Nova Scotia Supreme Court

O

P 
Premier of Nova Scotia
Political parties of Nova Scotia

Q

R

S 
Same-sex marriage in Nova Scotia
Shelburne dike
Robert Strang (physician)

T 
 Tourism on the Eastern Shore (Nova Scotia)

U

V

W

X

Y 
Yarmouth, Nova Scotia

Z

See also

Index of Canada-related articles

Nova Scotia